Wafa Be Mol is a 2021 Pakistani television soap family drama series aired on Hum TV from 9 August 2021 to 12 November 2021. It is produced by Momina Duraid under MD Productions. It stars Ali Abbas, Komal Meer, Arez Ahmed and Sukaina Khan in lead roles.

The serial released on Hum TV airing five episodes per week (from Monday to Friday) on 7:00 PST. The serial won "Best Soap Serial" at 8th Hum Awards.

Cast
Ali Abbas as Aazar
Komal Meer as Hania
Arez Ahmed as Shaheer
Sukaina Khan as Nazneen aka Naazi
Zain Afzal as Hammad
Abul Hassan as Aamir
Hina Javed as Fatima
Behroze Sabzwari as Mirza Yawar Baig
Zainab Qayyum as Rubina
Kanwal Khan as Shehzeen
Shehzeen Rahat as Noori
Fazila Qazi as Hajra
Kaiser Khan Nizamani as Haider
Namrah Shahid as Noshaba
Saife Hassan as Nasir
Sikandar Nawaz Rajput as Tariq
Hina Sheikh as Asiya
Nisha Rizwan

References

2021 Pakistani television series debuts
2021 Pakistani television series endings
Hum TV original programming